The Aberdeen Line was a shipping company founded in 1825. 

Aberdeen Line may also refer to:

 Aberdeen to Inverness Line, railway line in Scotland linking Aberdeen and Inverness
 Aberdeen Railway, historical railway line in Scotland linking Aberdeen and Guthrie
 Edinburgh to Aberdeen Line, railway line in Scotland linking Aberdeen and Edinburgh
 Glasgow to Aberdeen Line, railway line in Scotland linking Glasgow and Edinburgh

See also 
 Aberdeen (disambiguation)

sv:Aberdeen Line